Christine Guinaudeau (born 20 June 1978 at Cholet) is a French athlete, who specializes in race walking.

Biography  
She won eight champion of France walking titles. On the road, for the 10 km walk in 2010 and two for the 20 km walk in 2005 and 2009. She also won five Indoor French national titles for the 3,000 m walk.

She is the current holder of the France record for the 20 000 m walk (on track) walking 1:34.57, on 26 April 2009 at La Londe-les-Maures.

Prize list  
 French Championships in Athletics   :  
 winner of the 10 km walk in 2010   
 winner of the 20 km walk in 2005 and 2009   
 French Indoor Athletics Championships:  
 winner of 3000 m walk in 2006,  2007,  2008,  2009 and 2010

Records

Notes and references

External links  
 

1978 births
Living people
French female racewalkers
People from Cholet
Sportspeople from Maine-et-Loire